Alan Cochrane is a journalist, the Scottish editor of the British broadsheet newspaper The Daily Telegraph.

Life and career
Cochrane was born in Dundee and educated at Grove Academy in the city's Broughty Ferry area. He entered journalism as a sub-editor and reporter for DC Thomson before joining the Daily Express in Glasgow. Between the mid-1970s and the mid-1990s he was based in London, covering political issues across a number of newspapers.

In 1994 he was appointed as editor of the Scottish Daily Express before becoming deputy editor of Scotland on Sunday. In the late 1990s he became a columnist at The Daily Telegraph before taking up the role of its Scottish editor.

Notes

References
 
 

Living people
Scottish newspaper editors
Scottish unionists
Year of birth missing (living people)
Place of birth missing (living people)
Scottish political commentators
Journalists from Dundee
People from Broughty Ferry
The Daily Telegraph people